Nix is an unincorporated community in Franklin County, Alabama, United States.

References

Unincorporated communities in Franklin County, Alabama
Unincorporated communities in Alabama